"Sloughin' Blue" is the sixth single by Japanese electronica/rock band Boom Boom Satellites. It was initially released on January 24, 2001, as the second single from their second album Umbra.

Track listing

Personnel
Credits adapted from liner notes.
 Art Direction, Design – Shinichiro Hirata
 Drums [Additional] – Naoki Hirai
 Photography By – Yoshiyuki Hata
 Programmed By, Bass – Masayuki Nakano
 Vocals, Guitar – Michiyuki Kawashima
 Written-By – Boom Boom Satellites

References

External links 
 Boom Boom Satellites official website
 Sloughin Blue on Discogs.com

2001 songs
Boom Boom Satellites songs